Seta (also Σέττα - Setta) is a mountain village and a community in the northern part of the municipal unit of Amarynthos, on the island of Euboea, Greece.  In 2011 its population was 60 for the village and 92 for the community, which includes the village Kato Seta. It is situated in the mountainous interior of Euboea, northeast of the mountain Olympus and southeast of Dirfi, the highest mountain of the island. It is 10 km south of Stropones, 16 km north of Amarynthos and 30 km east of Chalcis. Seta suffered damage from the 2007 Greek forest fires.

Population

See also
List of settlements in the Euboea regional unit

External links
Video on Seta from ERT's travelling program Traveling in Greece (Menoume Ellada)

References

Populated places in Euboea